Enteromius tongaensis is a species of ray-finned fish in the genus Enteromius which has been recorded from a single location on the White Nile in South Sudan.

Footnotes 

 

Enteromius
Taxa named by Carl Hialmar Rendahl
Fish described in 1935
Endemic fauna of South Sudan